The 118 Squadron of the Israeli Air Force, also known as the Night Riders Squadron, is a helicopter squadron of CH-53-2025 Sea Stallions based at Tel Nof Airbase.
On 26 July 2010 a 118 Squadron Sikorsky CH-53 Sea Stallion Yas'ur helicopter crashed during a training flight at high altitude in the Carpathian mountains, near the city of Brasov in Romania. All on board died: four Israeli pilots, two Israeli mechanics and one Romanian officer.

See also 
 Third Battle of Mount Hermon
 1997 Israeli helicopter disaster
 Operation Sharp and Smooth
 2010 IAF Sikorsky CH-53 crash

References 

Israeli Air Force squadrons